Abraham Tzvi Hirsch ben Jacob Eisenstadt of Byelostok (1812–1868) (Hebrew: אברהם צבי הירש בן יעקב אייזנשטאט) served as rabbi in Utyan (Utena), government of Kovno, and died in Königsberg in 1868.

Works
He began at an early age to write his important work, Pitchei Teshuvah (פתחי תשובה), which is the most popular and useful index to the responsa and decisions of later authorities on the subjects treated in the Shulchan Aruch. Eisenstadt's great merit consists in having collected all the material given in the works of his predecessors, and in having added to it an almost complete collection of references to responsa of all the later eminent rabbis.

Of lesser value are the novellae which Eisenstadt added to Pitchei Teshuvah under the title Nachalat Tzvi. The part of Pitchei Teshuvah on Yoreh De'ah was published at Vilna in 1836 (republished Jitomir, 1840, and Lemberg, 1858); that on Even haEzer, in 1862; and, after the author's death, that on Ḥoshen Mishpaṭ, in Lemberg, 1876 (republished in Vilna, 1896).

Eisenstadt is also the author of a commentary on the Seder Gittin veHalitzah, by Michael ben Joseph of Cracow, Vilna, 1863, 2d ed. 1896.

References

 Its bibliography:
Fuenn, Keneset Yisrael, p. 10;
Isaac Benjacob, Oẓar ha-Sefarim, p. 586;
Joseph Zedner, Cat. Hebr. Books Brit. Mus. pp. 216, 814;
prefaces of the author to Yoreh De'ah and Eben ha-'Ezer

1812 births
1868 deaths
19th-century rabbis from the Russian Empire
People from Białystok
19th-century Lithuanian rabbis